Gamishli Nazar (also Romanized as Gāmīshlī Nazār; also known as Gāmīshlī and Gomīshlī) is a village in Jafarbay-ye Jonubi Rural District, in the Central District of Torkaman County, Golestan Province, Iran. At the 2006 census, its population was 1,002, with 215 families.

References 

Populated places in Torkaman County